United States v. Sprague, 282 U.S. 716 (1931), was a United States Supreme Court case that dealt with the Fifth Article of the US Constitution. The defendants had been indicted under the National Prohibition Act and were attempting to quash their indictments, arguing that the Eighteenth Amendment had not been properly ratified. Their reasoning was that the Congress of the United States had chosen to ratify it by usage of state legislatures instead of constitutional conventions. 

If this were held true, Congress would have exceeded its authority in passing the NPA. The court did not agree, however, ruling that the Constitution explicitly authorized Congress to determine the method used in ratifying amendments. In part, Article Five states that any amendment "shall be valid to all Intents and Purposes, as part of this Constitution, when ratified by the Legislatures of three-fourths of the several States, or by Conventions in three fourths thereof, as the one or the other Mode of Ratification may be proposed by the Congress" (emphasis added). 

Furthermore, the court rejected the defendants' claim that the Eighteenth Amendment needed to be ratified by state conventions since "all [previous amendments] save the Eighteenth dealt solely with governmental means and machinery rather than with the rights of the individual citizen." The Constitution does not make a difference between types of amendments, the court held, so the amendment, "by lawful proposal and ratification, has become a part of the Constitution."

See also
List of United States Supreme Court cases, volume 282

External links
 
 

1931 in United States case law
United States Supreme Court cases
United States Supreme Court cases of the Hughes Court
United States Constitution Article Five case law
United States Eighteenth Amendment case law